KBKF may refer to:

 KBKF-LD, a low-power television station (channel 6) licensed to San Jose, California, United States
 Buckley Space Force Base (ICAO code KBKF)